The Lonely Palette is an art history podcast hosted by Tamar Avishai, a lecturer at the Museum of Fine Arts, Boston. In each episode, Avishai focuses on a single work of art, explaining its historical context and significance. The podcast has been received positively by critics and won several awards.

Format
Each episode examines a single work of art. Avishai begins with a montage of person on the street interviews with museum-goers at the Museum of Fine Arts reacting the work. She then explains its historical context and significance.

Reception
The podcast has been received positively and recognized on a number of best-of lists. It won The Improper Bostonian 2018 best podcast award.

Episodes

Special Episodes

Interviews

References

External links

2016 podcast debuts
Audio podcasts
Art history
Arts podcasts